John Cushman may refer to:

 John P. Cushman (1784–1848), American lawyer and politician from New York
 John H. Cushman (1921–2017), U.S. Army general
 John C. Cushman III, American realtor